is located in the Hidaka Mountains, Hokkaidō, Japan.

See also
List of mountains and hills of Japan by height
Geography of Japan

References
 Google Maps
 Geographical Survey Institute

Obihiro